Verretto is a comune (municipality) in the Province of Pavia in the Italian region Lombardy, located about 45 km south of Milan and about 15 km south of Pavia.

Verretto borders the following municipalities: Casatisma, Casteggio, Castelletto di Branduzzo, Lungavilla, Montebello della Battaglia.

References

External links
 Official website

Cities and towns in Lombardy